Jace Chan is a female singer and actress from Hong Kong. She was first noticed by the general public because of her debut in acting in a 2017 TV series by ViuTV. She then debuted in the music industry in 2019 and won the New Artist Award on Metro Radio.  She also has won an award for her song "Quarantine".

Biography 
When Chan graduated from secondary school, she wanted to make a living from her interest in music.  She has graduated from Hong Kong Baptist University.  She has also worked as a dance teacher and an anchor for Billboard China.  After she graduated from University, she was chosen by Universal Music Hong Kong to be the anchor for their new web magazine, UMWebzine, interviewing artists on their behalf. She interviewed Shawn Mendes, Niall Horan, 5 Seconds of Summer, LANY, Jonas Blue etc. She also has filmed some videos branded as "JengJace" on her YouTube channel. In 2018, she became a stylist in King Maker, a Hong Kong singing contest, helping a stylist, Mayao Ma.

She has participated in music production when she was idle, uploading videos of herself covering different songs while performing with music group Dusty Bottle. Universal Music Hong Kong noticed her videos and signed her to their label. In 2019, she became one of the "Fabulous Four", becoming the new singer of that year. She released 3 songs that year, "想突然", a R&B song and invited the vocal of LMF and 24Herbs. Her second song, "想正常" is a heavier song, describing the conflicts in the latter stages in a relationship. Her third song, "講"'s demo was recorded in Paris.

In 2020, Chan collaborated with composer Alex Fung, composing the melody of the song "天生二品" with hirsk, a Hong Kong Composer. The song was a success, managing to get to the top of the Music Charts of ViuTV, Commercial Radio, Metro Radio and RTHK.  In that August, she released a love song, Quarantine, collaborating with Alex Fung again. The song's lyrics were written by YIU SUM and KW Chu, and the music video was directed by a former DJ of RTHK, Jerry Wong. Her friends, Z. Koo and Chung Suet Ying were the main actors in the music video. The song was another success, topping the charts on iTunes, MusicOne, and  KKBOX.  This song also became one of the 10 best songs recommended by Metro Radio.  A duet version with indie singer Terence Lam being the boy waiting for his crush.

In 2021, Chan reused the crew of the song "天生二品", Terence Lam was also invited to be a co-composer of the song "虛擬人與我", this song is about a relationship online.  She released her first album, Processing on 14 May 2021, the album reached the golden award sales (15,000 copies sold) on the first day of sale.  The songs from the album was listened on MOOV for approximately 2 million times.  The album contained all the previous songs and a new song, "I Wish". The song wants to express the hope for relieving stress and to do things the audience likes without being restricted.
It became the top song on the charts of RTHK, Commercial Radio, TVB and ViuTV.  Chan has also invited the vocal of bands Chochukmo and R.O.O.T, Jan Curious to record a Poolside Version.  In July, Chan was chosen by Spotify to be the Hong Kong representative for their EQUAL Global Music Program of July, her portrait was on the screen of New York Times Square.  On 20 August, Chan held her first concert under the sponsorship of American Express, but the way for getting tickets for the concert led to disputes in the music community.

In 2022, She released a R&B song 'Long D' composed by Jay Fung, she acted many classic old Hong Kong movie scenes in mv. She played 21 shows of musical 'Bye-Bye Your Tale' in August.

Discography

Albums 

Singles
 沒有無緣無故的恨 (2021)
 收聲多謝 (2021)
 Long D (2022)

Other Songs 
 2018: I'll be You (Promotional music for Universal Music Hong Kong, appearing as the anchor of UMwebzine in the music video)
 2018: Summer Thing (Personal creation)
 2018: Forever Summer (English song of the Hong Kong band Dusty Bottle, also the lyricist for the song.)
 2019: Chung Full Hustle (Theme song for Commercial Radio program Chung Full Hustle, also the composer of the song)
 2019: 困獸鬥 (Theme song for ViuTV drama Showman's Show, featuring FatBoy@ERROR)
 2020: Last Seen! (Theme song for Commercial Radio program Medication for Insomnia and the music in another program, Last Seen!.  featuring OSCAR, Yanny Chan and Anson Kong)
 2021: Before 30 (Theme song for Commercial Radio program Medication for Insomnia and the music in another program, Last Seen! Season 5.  featuring OSCAR, Yanny Chan and Anson Kong and Kaho Hung)
 2022: This Is How We Roll (Featuring in P1X3L's song)

Songs Chart on Billboard Hits of the World Hong Kong Songs

Filmography

Drama

TV Shows

Educational TV Shows

Videography

Music videos

Performances

Personal

Cooperative

Other concerts

Awards and nominations

Music Awards

References

External links 
 Jace Chan's YouTube Channel
 

1994 births
Living people
Alumni of Hong Kong Baptist University
Universal Music Group artists
Hong Kong television presenters
Hong Kong film actresses
Hong Kong television actresses
Cantopop singers
Hong Kong women singers
21st-century Hong Kong women singers
Hong Kong idols
English-language singers from Hong Kong